The Petersenspitze is a peak in the Weisskamm group of the Ötztal Alps best known for its north face. In combination with the north faces of the Taschachwand and the Hinterer Brochkogel it forms the challenging Ötztaler Eisexpress route to the Wildspitze. Petersenspitze is named after Theodor Petersen, who had many first ascents in the Ötztal Alps in between 1871 and 1893, including those of Texelspitze, Roteck, Rofelewand, Hinterer Brunnenkogel, Bliggspitze, Hintereisspitzen, Verpeilspitze, Schwabenkopf, and Rostizkogel.

External links
 Petersenspitze at Summitpost

Mountains of Tyrol (state)
Mountains of the Alps
Alpine three-thousanders
Ötztal Alps